The National Bank of Kazakhstan is the central bank of Kazakhstan.

History

The National Bank of Kazakhstan was established on the basis of the Kazakh Republican Bank of the State Bank of the USSR (since 1990 - the State Bank of the Kazakh SSR, since 1991 - the National State Bank of the Kazakh SSR).

On April 13, 1993, in accordance with the Law "On the National Bank of the Republic of Kazakhstan", the National Bank of the Kazakh SSR was renamed the National Bank of the Republic of Kazakhstan.

On March 30, 1995, a new Law of the Republic of Kazakhstan dated March 30, 1995 No. 2155 "On the National Bank of the Republic of Kazakhstan" was issued.

On 15 November 1999, the National Bank of Kazakhstan became the founder and the sole shareholder of the Kazakhstan Deposit Insurance Fund ("KDIF").

Management Structure
The National Bank is accountable to the President of the Republic of Kazakhstan, but acting independently to the extent scope of authority granted under the legislation thereto.
The National Bank coordinates its activities with the Government of the Republic of Kazakhstan, taking into account and facilitating the economic policy of the government, unless it contradicts the implementation of its own basic functions and monetary policy.

The supreme governing body of the National Bank is the Management Board, and the operational control authority is the Board of Directors. The Management Board consists of nine people. The Management Board includes the Chairman of the National Bank and four officials (Vice-Chairmen) of the National Bank, one representative of the President of the Republic of Kazakhstan, two government representatives of the Republic of Kazakhstan and the Chairman of the Committee for Control and Supervision of the Financial Market and Financial Institutions of the National Bank.

The organisational structure of the National Bank of Kazakhstan comprises the followingCentral headquarters:
 the Central Office consisting of 11 departments (with one department in Nur-Sultan), 10 independent offices and 1 independent department
 16 regional branches and one branch in the City of Almaty: Cash and Custody Services Centre
 Five reporting entities:
 Centre for Operational Support of the National Bank of the Republic of Kazakhstan, Joint Stock Company
 Kazakhstan Interbank Settlement Centre, the Republican State Enterprise on the Right of Economic Use
 Banking Service Office of the National Bank of Kazakhstan, Joint Stock Company
 Kazakhstan Mint of the National Bank of the Republic of Kazakhstan, the Republican State Enterprise on the Right of Economic Use
 The Banknote Factory of the National Bank of the Republic of Kazakhstan, the Republican State Enterprise on the Right of Economic Use

Governors

Shares  
The National Bank of the Republic of Kazakhstan is the stockholder of the following corporations:
 Kazakhstan Deposit Insurance Fund;
 Unified Accumulative Pension Fund, Joint Stock Company

Location  
Nur-Sultan city, Mangilik El street, 57A.

See also

Economy of Kazakhstan
Kazakhstani tenge

Notes

References

External links
  

.
Kazakhstan
Financial services companies of Kazakhstan
Government-owned companies of Kazakhstan
Banks established in 1993
1993 establishments in Kazakhstan
 01